Baba Abbas Sanitorium is a village and sanitorium in Koregah-e Gharbi Rural District, in the Central District of Khorramabad County, Lorestan Province, Iran. At the 2006 census, its population was 149, in 38 families.

References 

Towns and villages in Khorramabad County